Józef Gilewski (born 21 March 1971) is a Polish boxer. He competed in the men's light middleweight event at the 1996 Summer Olympics.

References

1971 births
Living people
Polish male boxers
Olympic boxers of Poland
Boxers at the 1996 Summer Olympics
People from Tarnowskie Góry County
Light-middleweight boxers